Garcinia quaesita is a species of flowering plant in the family Clusiaceae. It is found only in Sri Lanka.

Common names

English: red mango, Indian tamarind, brindleberry
Sinhala: kana goraka, honda goraka
Tamil: korakkaipuli

Etymology

The generic name is after L. Garcin (1683–1751)

References

Endemic flora of Sri Lanka
Vulnerable plants
quaesita
Taxonomy articles created by Polbot